Timeline of geopolitical changes may refer to:

 Timeline of geopolitical changes (before 1500)
 Timeline of geopolitical changes (1500–1899)
 Timeline of geopolitical changes (1900–1999)
 Timeline of geopolitical changes (2000–present)
 List of national border changes from 1815 to 1914
 List of national border changes (1914–present)